Judaeo-Portuguese, or Judeo-Lusitanic, is said to be the extinct Jewish language that was used by the Jews of Portugal.

See also 
 History of the Jews in Portugal
 Spanish and Portuguese Jews
 Lusophone
 Lusitanic
 Pallache family
 Judeo-Spanish

References
 Judaeo-Portuguese in Jewish Language Research Center
Thesouro dos Dinim, a halakhic work (annotated transcription) 
Thesouro dos Dinim, a halakhic work (partial facsimile)
 Menasseh Ben Israel de la fragilidad humana y inclinacion del hombre al peccado. Parte primera

 Strolovitch, Devon L.  (2005)  Old Portuguese in Hebrew Script: Convention, Contact, and Convivência.  Ph.D. dissertation, Cornell University, Ithaca, NY.

Extinct Romance languages
Jews and Judaism in Portugal
Judeo-Romance languages
Languages of Portugal
Portuguese language
Portuguese dialects
Extinct languages of Europe
Sephardi Jewish culture